Ken Wolf (born December 30, 1937) is an American politician in the state of Minnesota. He served in the Minnesota House of Representatives for five terms from 1993 to 2002. He had previously served as mayor of Burnsville, Minnesota in 1993, and also as Burnsville city councilmen from 1983 to 1993.

References

Republican Party members of the Minnesota House of Representatives
People from Burnsville, Minnesota
1937 births
Living people